Wheeler's Point is an unincorporated community in Wheeler Township, Lake of the Woods County, Minnesota, United States. It is 12 miles north of Baudette.

County Road 8 and Minnesota State Highway 172 are two of the main routes in the community.

Wheeler's Point is located at the Four Mile Bay at the southern end of the Lake of the Woods.  The entry to the Rainy River is also at this point.

The community of Hackett and Zippel Bay State Park are also nearby.

References

Further reading
Rand McNally Road Atlas - 2007 edition - Minnesota entry
Official State of Minnesota Highway Map - 2007/2008 edition

Unincorporated communities in Lake of the Woods County, Minnesota
Unincorporated communities in Minnesota
Lake of the Woods